Sears, Roebuck and Co., commonly known as Sears, is an American chain of department stores founded in 1892 by Richard Warren Sears and Alvah Curtis Roebuck and reincorporated in 1906 by Richard Sears and Julius Rosenwald, with what began as a mail ordering catalog company migrating to opening retail locations in 1925, the first in Chicago. In 2005, the company was bought by the management of the American big box discount chain Kmart, which upon completion of the merger, formed Sears Holdings. Through the 1980s, Sears was the largest retailer in the United States.  In 2018, it was the 31st-largest. After several years of declining sales, Sears's parent company filed for Chapter 11 bankruptcy on October 15, 2018. It announced on January 16, 2019, that it had won its bankruptcy auction, and that a reduced number of 425 stores would remain open, including 223 Sears stores.

Sears was based in the Sears Tower in Chicago from 1973 until 1995, and is currently headquartered in Hoffman Estates, Illinois. Sears announced in 2021 that it would be selling its Hoffman Estates headquarters complex. On December 12, 2022, Sears Authorized Hometown Stores, LLC, and affiliated debtor Sears Hometown, Inc., filed for Chapter 11 bankruptcy protection, and on the 26th announced the liquidation of the 115 largely owner-operated Hometown stores.

As of February 9, 2023, there were 17 full-line Sears stores, Sears Appliance & Mattress, and Sears Home & Life stores remaining.

History

Beginnings

Richard Warren Sears was born in 1863 in Stewartville, Minnesota to a wealthy family which moved to nearby Spring Valley. In 1879, his father died shortly after losing the family fortune in a speculative stock deal. Sears moved across the state to work as a railroad station agent in North Redwood, then Minneapolis.

While he was in North Redwood, a jeweler refused delivery on a shipment of watches. Sears purchased them and sold them at a low price to the station agents, making a profit. He started a mail-order watch business in Minneapolis in 1886, calling it the R.W. Sears Watch Company. That year, he met Alvah Curtis Roebuck, a watch repairman. In 1887, Sears and Roebuck relocated the business to Chicago, and the company published Richard Sears's first mail-order catalog, offering watches, diamonds, and jewelry.

In 1889, Sears sold his business for $100,000 ($3 million in 2021 dollars) and relocated to Iowa, planning to be a rural banker. He returned to Chicago in 1892 and established a new mail-order firm, again selling watches and jewelry, with Roebuck as his partner, operating as the A. C. Roebuck watch company. In 1893, they renamed the company Sears, Roebuck, and Co. and began to diversify the product lines offered in their catalogs.

Before the Sears catalog, farmers near small rural towns usually purchased supplies, often at high prices and on credit, from local general stores with narrow selections of goods. Prices were negotiated and relied on the storekeeper's estimate of a customer's creditworthiness. Sears built an opposite business model by offering in their catalogs a larger selection of products at published prices.

By 1894, the Sears catalog had grown to 322 pages, including many new items, such as sewing machines, bicycles, sporting goods and automobiles (later produced, from 1905 to 1915, by Lincoln Motor Car Works of Chicago [no relation to the current Ford line]). By 1895, the company was producing a 532-page catalog. Sales were over $400,000 ($12 million in 2021 dollars) in 1893 and over $750,000 ($20 million in 2021 dollars) two years later. By 1896, dolls, stoves, and groceries were added to the catalog.

Despite the strong and growing sales, the national Panic of 1893 led to a full-scale recession, causing a cash squeeze and large quantities of unsold merchandise by 1895. Roebuck decided to quit, returning later in a publicity role. Sears offered Roebuck's half of the company to Chicago businessman Aaron Nusbaum, who in turn brought in his brother-in-law Julius Rosenwald, to whom Sears owed money. In August 1895, they bought Roebuck's half of the company for $75,000 ($ million today), and that month the company was reincorporated in Illinois with a capital stock of $150,000 ($ million today). The transaction was handled by Albert Henry Loeb of Chicago law firm Loeb & Adler (now Arnstein & Lehr); copies of the transaction are still displayed on the firm's walls.

Early 20th century

Sears and Rosenwald got along well with each other, but not with Nusbaum; they bought his interest in the firm for $1.3 million in 1903 ($ million today). Rosenwald brought to the mail-order firm a rational management philosophy and diversified product lines: dry goods, consumer durables, drugs, hardware, furniture, and nearly anything else a farm household could desire.

Sales continued to proliferate, and the prosperity of the company and their vision for more significant expansion led Sears and Rosenwald to take the company public in 1906, with a stock placement of $40 million ($ billion today). They had to incorporate a new company to bring the operation public; Sears and Rosenwald established Sears, Roebuck and Company with the legal name Sears, Roebuck and Co., in the state of New York, which effectively replaced the original company. The current company inherits the history of the old company, celebrating the original 1892 incorporation, rather than the 1906 revision, as the start of the company.

Sears's successful 1906 initial public offering (IPO) marks the first major retail IPO in American financial history and represented a coming of age, financially, of the consumer sector. The company traded under the ticker symbol S and was a component of the Dow Jones Industrial Average from 1924 to 1999.

In 1906, Sears opened its catalog plant and the Sears Merchandise Building Tower in Chicago's West Side. The building was the anchor of what would become the massive  Sears, Roebuck and Company Complex of offices, laboratories, and mail-order operations at Homan Avenue and Arthington Street. The complex served as corporate headquarters until 1973 when the Sears Tower was completed and served as the base of the mail-order catalog business until 1995.

By 1907, under Rosenwald's leadership as vice president and treasurer, annual sales of the company climbed to roughly $50 million ($ billion today). Sears resigned from the presidency in 1908 due to declining health, with Rosenwald named president and chairman of the board and taking on full control.

In 1910, Sears acquired the David Bradley Plow company. This acquisition would lead to the manufacturing of riding mowers, chainsaws, tillers, etc., in the Bradley Illinois factory.

The company was badly hurt during 1919–21 as a severe depression hit the nation's farms after farmers had over-expanded their holdings. To bail out the company, Rosenwald pledged $21 million ($ million today) of his personal wealth in 1921. By 1922, Sears regained financial stability.

Boom years

Brick and mortar 
Rosenwald decided to shift emphasis to urban America and brought in Robert E. Wood to take charge. 
Rosenwald oversaw the design and construction of the firm's first department store, built on land within the Sears, Roebuck, and Company Complex. The store opened in 1925. In 1924, Rosenwald resigned the presidency but remained as chair until he died in 1932; his goal was to devote more time to philanthropy.

The first store opened on February 2, 1925, as an experiment in the North Lawndale Sears, Roebuck and Company Complex. Despite its remote location on the outskirts of Chicago, its success led to dozens of further openings across the country, many in conjunction with the company's mail-order offices, typically in lower-middle-class and working-class neighborhoods, far from the main downtown shopping district. This was considered highly unconventional at a time when shopping was concentrated in city centers, but through World War II, there was an extensive streetcar network in Chicago and other US cities. However, rapidly increasing car ownership and the brand's huge popularity helped attract customers.

Sears retail stores were pioneering and broke the conventions of the time in three ways: their location away from central shopping districts, innovative store design, and unconventional product mix and retailing practices. Many stores at this time were designed by architect George C. Nimmons and his firms. The architecture was driven by merchandising needs rather than the desired outer appearance. This made the stores excellent examples of the modern architecture of the time – styles made famous by Bertram Goodhue and Eliel Saarinen.

Its stores were oriented to motorists. Set apart from existing business districts amid residential areas occupied by their target audience, they had ample, free, off-street parking and communicated a clear corporate identity. In the 1930s, the company designed fully air-conditioned, "windowless" stores, such as Sears-Pico in 1939 in Los Angeles, which was the first to have an open plan selling floor (instead of breaking up the floor into discrete sections).

Sears was also a pioneer in creating department stores that catered to men and women. The stores included hardware and building materials. It de-emphasized the latest clothing fashions in favor of practical and durable clothing and allowed customers to select goods without the aid of a clerk.

In 1933, Sears issued the first of its Christmas catalogs known as the "Sears Wishbook", a catalog featuring toys and gifts, separate from the annual Christmas Catalog. From 1908 to 1940, it included ready-to-assemble Sears Catalog Home kit houses.

Sears opened its first store in Mexico City in 1947; the Mexican stores would later spin off into Sears Mexico, which in 2020 operated more than 75 stores across Mexico. In July 2021, it was announced that Sears Mexico is considering renaming their stores to distance itself from its failing former parent in the United States.

From the 1920s to the 1950s, Sears built many urban department stores in the U.S., Canada, and Mexico (apart from, but not far from, existing central business districts), and they overshadowed the mail-order business. Following World War II, the company expanded into suburban markets and malls. In 1959, it had formed the Homart Development Company for developing malls. Many of the company's stores have undergone major renovations or replacements since the 1980s. Sears began to diversify in the 1930s, creating Allstate Insurance Company in 1931 and placing Allstate representatives in its stores in 1934 (Allstate was also used as a house brand on a range of motorized vehicles sold by Sears). Over the decades, it established major national brands, such as Kenmore, Craftsman, DieHard, Silvertone, Supertone, and Toughskins.

The success of Sears outdoor products raised the attention of the Federal Government and the antitrust laws. Sears purchased David Bradley to manufacture farm and lawn equipment. Its success was broken up in 1962 as they sold more plows than John Deere. Sears sold 1/2 of the David Bradley factory in Bradley, Illinois to the Newark Ohio Company that was shortly acquired by Roper Industries.

Sears reached its pinnacle in the 1970s. In 1974, Sears completed the 110-story Sears Tower in Chicago, which became the world's tallest building, a title it took from the former Twin Towers in New York. Upon moving out of Chicago, Sears sold the Sears Tower in 1988. In the sale contract of the tower, Sears retained its naming rights to the building until 2003, but the Sears Tower retained the name until early 2009, when London-based insurer Willis Group Holdings, Ltd. was given the building's naming rights to encourage them to occupy the building. Sears moved to the new Prairie Stone Business Park in Hoffman Estates, Illinois, between 1993 and 1995. The Sears Centre is a 10,001-seat multi-purpose arena located in Hoffman Estates adjacent to the Prairie Stone campus.

Mail order 
The Sears catalog became known in the industry as "the Consumers' Bible". The company sold to foreign customers, such as after the American occupation of Greenland in World War II, Philippines, among others, when locals ordered from catalogs left by soldiers. Novelists and story writers often portrayed the importance of the catalog in the emotional lives of rural folk. The catalog also entered the language, particularly of rural dwellers, as a euphemism for toilet paper, as its pages could be torn out and used as such. In addition, for many rural African-Americans, especially in areas dominated by Jim Crow racial segregation, the Sears catalog was a vital retail alternative to local white-population-dominated stores, bypassing the stores' frequent intention to deny them fair access to their merchandise.

However, as the nation urbanized, Sears's catalog business faced competition from city department stores. Rural America's population was slow-growing and possessed far less spending power than urban America.

Decline
In the 1980s, the company began to diversify into non-retail entities such as buying Dean Witter and Coldwell Banker in 1981. In 1984, it launched Prodigy as a joint venture with IBM, and introduced the Discover credit card in 1985. However, these actions have been said to have distracted management's attention from the core retail business and allowed competing retailers to gain significant ground, culminating with Walmart surpassing Sears as the largest retailer in the United States in 1990.

In the 1990s, the company began divesting itself of many non-retail entities, which were detrimental to its bottom line. Sears spun off its financial services arm, which included brokerage business Dean Witter Reynolds and Discover Card. It sold its mall building subsidiary Homart to General Growth Properties in 1995. Sears later acquired hardware chain Orchard Supply Hardware in 1996 and started home improvement store The Great Indoors in 1997.

The cost of distributing the once highly influential general merchandise catalog became prohibitive; sales and profits had declined. The company discontinued the catalog in 1993. It dismissed 50,000 workers who had filled the orders.

In 1992, California successfully sued the company for falsely finding things wrong with automobiles in for repair for other reasons. In 1997, criminal charges were made. In 1998, Sears announced it had sold the remnants of Western Auto (which it had acquired in 1988) to Roanoke-based Advance Auto Parts. The business deal was not what experts in the after-market automotive industry expected: Sears, Roebuck became "one of the largest shareholders" after obtaining a 40% stake in Advance Auto Parts and merging their two store networks, which included Western Auto's wholesale and retail operations. The existing store network of Advance Auto Parts, comprising 915 stores in 17 U.S. states, merged with 590 U.S.-based Parts America Stores in addition to 40 Western Auto stores in the Commonwealth of Puerto Rico. In 1997, Sears sold 85% of its Mexico affiliate to Grupo Carso. Sears Holdings continued to produce specialty catalogs and reintroduced a smaller version of the Holiday Wish Book in 2007.

In 2003, Sears sold its U.S. retail credit card operation to Citibank. The remaining card operations for Sears Canada were sold to JPMorgan Chase in August 2005. In 2003, Sears opened a new concept store called Sears Grand. Sears Grand stores carried everything that a regular Sears carries, and more. A 2021 article in Forbes stated that most Sears Grand stores were shuttered by 2010.

On November 17, 2004, Kmart Holdings Corporation announced it would acquire Sears, Roebuck, and Co. for $11 billion after Kmart completed its recovery from bankruptcy. As a part of the acquisition, Kmart Holding Corporation, along with Sears, Roebuck, and Co., was transformed into the new Sears Holdings Corporation. The new company started trading on the NASDAQ stock exchange as SHLD; Sears sold its single-letter ticker symbol 'S' in the New York Stock Exchange that it had held since 1910 to Sprint Corporation. The new corporation announced that it would continue to operate stores under both the Sears and Kmart brands. In 2005, the company began renovating some Kmart stores and converting them to the Sears Essentials format, only to change them later to Sears Grands. The combined company's profits peaked at $1.5 billion in 2006.

By 2010, the company was no longer profitable; from 2011 to 2016, the company lost $10.4 billion. In 2014, its total debt ($4.2 billion at the end of January 2017) exceeded its market capitalization ($974.1 million as of March 21, 2017). Sears declined from more than 3,500 physical stores to 695 US stores from 2010 to 2017. Sales at Sears stores dropped 10.3 percent in the final quarter of 2016 when compared to the same period in 2015.

Sears spent much of 2014 and 2015 selling off portions of its balance sheet; namely, Lands' End and its stake in Sears Canada, one of the biggest e-commerce players in Canada, with Can$505 million in sales in 2015—more than Walmart and others who had begun pushing aggressively into online sales, such as Canadian Tire. Sears stated that the company was looking to focus on becoming a more tech-driven retailer. Sears's CEO and top shareholder said the sell-off of key assets in the last year had given the retailer the money it needs to speed up its transformation. Sears Holdings had lost a total of US$7 billion in the four years to 2015. In part, the retailer was trying to curb losses by using a loyalty program called Shop Your Way. Sears believed the membership scheme would enhance repeat business and customer loyalty in the long term.

CEO Eddie Lampert also concluded an arrangement that sold the Craftsman brand to Stanley Black & Decker Inc. for approximately US$900 million. In October 2017, Sears and appliance manufacturer Whirlpool Corporation ended their 101-year-old association, reportedly due to pricing issues, although Whirlpool continued supplying Sears with Kenmore-branded appliances. In May 2018, Sears announced it had formed a "special committee" to explore the sale of Kenmore.

Bankruptcy and current operations

On September 24, 2018, the retailer's CEO warned that the company was "running out of time" to salvage its business. Sears Holdings filed for Chapter 11 bankruptcy on October 15, 2018, ahead of a $134 million debt payment due that day. On November 23, 2018, Sears Holdings released a list of 505 stores, including 266 Sears stores, that were for sale in the bankruptcy process, while all others would hold liquidation sales.

On January 16, 2019, Sears Holdings announced it would remain open after Lampert won a bankruptcy auction for the company with an offer to keep about 400 stores open. On February 7, 2019, a bankruptcy judge approved a $5.2 billion plan by Sears's chairman and biggest shareholder to keep the business going. The approval meant roughly 425 stores, including 223 Sears stores, and 45,000 jobs would be preserved.

In April 2019, Sears announced the opening of three new stores with a limited set of merchandise under the name Sears Home & Life. Also that month, Sears closed its store at Windward Mall in Kaneohe, Hawaii, and its store at Oakbrook Center in Oak Brook, Illinois (which was razed and already rebuilt as a 1 story store), making it the first post-bankruptcy closure for the brand since being bought by ESL.

On June 3, 2019, the company announced that Transform Holdco would acquire Sears Hometown & Outlet Stores. As per deal, it might need to divest its Sears Outlet division to gain approval. On August 6, 2019, it was announced that 26 stores, including 21 Sears stores, including the last Sears store in Alabama, at Riverchase Galleria in Hoover, and the last Sears store in West Virginia, at Huntington Mall in Barboursville, would close in October, with plans to "accelerate the expansion of our smaller store formats which includes opening additional Home & Life stores and adding several hundred Sears Hometown stores after the Sears Hometown and Outlet transaction closes." On August 31, 2019, management announced that Transform would close an additional 92 stores, including 15 Sears stores, by the end of 2019. 100 more stores closed by January 2020. 51 Sears stores were closed in February 2020. More stores continued to close throughout 2020 and 2021, including the final Sears in Maine at The Maine Mall. As of September 16, 2021 the company's website listed 35 Sears stores.

Near the end of 2019, Sears sold the brand name DieHard to Advance Auto Parts for $200 million.

In September 2021, Sears announced that it would close more stores, including the last Sears store in New York City. The New York City Sears closed by November 24, 2021, and will potentially be redeveloped.

In December 2021, Transformco announced its plans to sell the 2.3 million-square-foot Sears headquarters in Hoffman Estates, which includes 100 acres of undeveloped land.

On January 19, 2022, Sears shut the remaining 15 Sears Auto Centers in the United States. The Sears Auto Center website now displays a message reading: "Auto Centers have closed for business. We appreciate your patronage over the years. If you have any questions concerning warranty claims, please visit us at Sears Help."

Although the organization is a shadow of its former self, it still operates a few locations. In May 2022, it was announced that roughly 100 more Sears Hometown stores, including the last four in Michigan, would close permanently.

On December 13, 2022, Sears Hometown filed for Chapter 11 bankruptcy. It was later revealed that all remaining Sears Hometown stores would be liquidated and permanently closed.

Corporate affairs

Logo

Sponsorships
Before the company filed for bankruptcy, Sears sponsored many entertainment and sporting events.

From 2006 until 2020, it had the naming rights to an 11,000-seat multi-purpose family entertainment, cultural and sports center in Hoffman Estates that was previously known then as the Sears Centre but has since been renamed the Now Arena.

The company sponsored the television series Extreme Makeover: Home Edition. The company also underwrote the PBS television series Mister Rogers' Neighborhood, under the name The Sears-Roebuck Foundation, from the show's premiere in 1968 until 1992.

Through the Sears Auto Centers, the company sponsored the Formula Drift Darren McNamara Sears/Falken Saturn Sky drift car. It sponsored the NASCAR Truck Series, using the Craftsman brand as the title sponsor, from the series' inception in the 1995 NASCAR SuperTruck Series presented by Craftsman to the 2008 season, when the agreement ended. It sponsored the #10 Gillett Evernham Motorsports car of Scott Riggs for the September 2, 2007, running of the Sharp AQUOS 500 at California Speedway through its Sears Auto Center branch. However, Riggs failed to qualify for the event. In 2016, Craftsman became the title sponsor of the World Racing Group, World of Outlaws Sprint car racing series.

Employee relations

Sears has struggled with employee relations. One notable example was the shift in 1992 from an hourly wage based on longevity to a base wage (usually between US$3.50 and US$6 per hour) and commissions ranging from 0.5% to 11%. Sears claimed the new base wage, often constituting a substantial (up to 40%) cut in pay, was done "to be successful in this highly competitive environment".

In early October 2007, Sears cut commission rates for employees in some departments to between 0.5% and 4% but equalized the base wage across all Home Improvement and Electronics departments. In 2011, commission rates on non-base items were cut by 2% in the electronics department. In late 2009, the electronic department's commission on "base items" was cut to 1%. As of 2017, appliances is the only remaining department where compensation is based entirely on commission. Other departments give a base pay plus commission. In many stores, jewelry department associates receive a low base salary with a 1% commission on their sales.

In March 2019, Sears claimed that it was ending life insurance benefits for an undisclosed number of its 90,000 retirees. A few months earlier, the company handed out over $25 million in bonuses to executives. This key Sears Retiree Benefit was worth between $5,000 and $15,000 for most of the pool (29,000) of eligible retired employees.

In May 2019, former Sears Holdings chairman and CEO Eddie Lampert, months after purchasing the remains of Sears from the holding company, threatened not to pay out the $43 million in pension payments owed to 90,000 former Sears and Kmart employees and retirees. A Forbes editorial pointed out that Steven Mnuchin, Secretary of the Treasury at the time, was a board member of Sears Holding until 2016, and was, at the time, one of three directors of the Pension Benefit Guaranty Corporation, which manages administration of pensions for defunct or bankrupt businesses.

Gallery

See also

Gala-Sears – disbanded Chilean unit
Sears Canada – disbanded Canadian unit
Sears (Mexico) – Mexican unit held by Grupo Carso
Sears plc – former UK company unrelated to U.S. retailer

References

Further reading
 Chang, Myong-Hun, and Joseph E. Harrington Jr. (December 1998). "Organizational structure and firm innovation in a retail chain". Computational & Mathematical Organization Theory 3.4: 267–288. . Compares Sears's Robert E. Wood with Montgomery Ward's Sewell Avery.
 
 Emmet, Boris, and John E. Jeuck. Catalogues and counters: A history of Sears Roebuck and Company (1950).

External links

 Sears Catalogs: online scans of pages from several past Sears catalogs

Companies based in Cook County, Illinois
Department stores of the United States
Former components of the Dow Jones Industrial Average
Hoffman Estates, Illinois
Lists of brands by company
Mail-order retailers
Manufactured home manufacturers
Online marketplaces of the United States
Sears Holdings
American companies established in 1892
Retail companies established in 1892
1892 establishments in Illinois
Companies that filed for Chapter 11 bankruptcy in 2018